Sankt Peter may refer to several places in Austria:
Sankt Peter am Kammersberg, in Styria
Sankt Peter am Ottersbach, in Styria 
Sankt Peter im Sulmtal, in Styria
Sankt Peter ob Judenburg, in Styria
Sankt Peter-Freienstein, in Styria
Sankt Peter am Hart, in Upper Austria 
Sankt Peter am Wimberg, in Upper Austria  
Aspangberg-Sankt Peter, in Lower Austria  
Sankt Peter in der Au, in Lower Austria
Sankt Peter, Baden-Wurttemberg, Germany
Sankt Peter-Ording, Schleswig-Holstein, Germany
Sankt Peter, Baden-Württemberg, in Germany

See also 
 St. Peter (disambiguation)
 Saint Peter (disambiguation)